James Robert Evans (September 12, 1843  – December 27, 1918) was an American Civil War soldier and Medal of Honor recipient (date of issue: February 25, 1895).

Biography
Evans was born in New York City on September 12, 1843. He died December 27, 1918, at Caldwell, New Jersey, and was buried at the First Reformed Church Cemetery, Pompton Plains, New Jersey.

Civil War
A private in Company "H" of the 62nd New York State Volunteers (the Anderson Zouaves), Evans was awarded his Medal of Honor for gallantry at the Battle of the Wilderness, Virginia, on May 5, 1864. 

Evans enlisted on June 30, 1861, at New York City as a musician. On July 3, 1861, he mustered into Company "F" of the Anderson Zouaves infantry regiment. On the same day, he was transferred from company "F" to company "H". He mustered out on June 29, 1864, at Petersburg, Virginia.

Sgt. Charles E. Morse of Company "I" of the same regiment also received the Medal of Honor for his actions on the same day to rescue the regimental flag from a "mortally wounded" color sergeant, John H. L. Gilmore.

Medal of Honor citation
Rank and organization: Private, Company H, 62d New York Infantry. Place and date: At Wilderness, Va., May 5, 1864. Entered service at: New York, N.Y. Birth: New York, N.Y. Date of issue: February 25, 1895. 

Citation:

Went out in front of the line under a fierce fire and, in the face of the rapidly advancing enemy, rescued the regimental flag with which the color bearer had fallen.

See also

List of Medal of Honor recipients
List of American Civil War Medal of Honor recipients: A–F

References

External links

1845 births
1918 deaths
United States Army Medal of Honor recipients
People of New York (state) in the American Civil War
Union Army soldiers
American Civil War recipients of the Medal of Honor